The 2018 Charlottesville Men's Pro Challenger was a professional tennis tournament played on indoor hard courts. It was the tenth edition of the tournament which was part of the 2018 ATP Challenger Tour, taking place in Charlottesville, United States from October 29 to November 4, 2018.

Singles main-draw entrants

Seeds

 1 Rankings are as of October 22, 2018.

Other entrants
The following players received wildcards into the singles main draw:
  Collin Altamirano
  Bradley Klahn
  Thai-Son Kwiatkowski
  Michael Mmoh

The following player received entry into the singles main draw as an alternate:
  Jelle Sels
 
The following players received entry from the qualifying draw:
  Petros Chrysochos
  Marcos Giron
  Lloyd Glasspool
  Denis Yevseyev

The following players received entry as lucky losers:
  Jared Hiltzik
  Tommy Paul

Champions

Singles

 Tommy Paul def.  Peter Polansky 6–2, 6–2.

Doubles

 Harri Heliövaara /  Henri Laaksonen def.  Toshihide Matsui /  Frederik Nielsen 6–3, 6–4.

References

2018 ATP Challenger Tour
2018
2018 in American tennis
2018 in sports in Virginia